Illyas Lee (born 1 December 1995) is a Singaporean professional footballer who plays as a defender for Singaporean club Hougang United FC and the Singapore national under-22 football team. He has been described as 'the next N'Golo Kante' due to his affinity on defence.

Club career 
Lee started off his footballing career in 2015 when he signed for Warriors but made no appearances for the club.

He then signed for Young Lions in 2016 and did not make any appearances for the club too. He then made his debut in 2017. He even captained the Young Lions against Balestier Khalsa on 22 June 2017.

Career statistics 

Update 1 March 2020

International career 
Lee represented Singapore for the under-22s national team, and has been appointed as captain of the team on several occasions.

International Statistics

U22/23 International caps

U19 International caps

References

Singaporean footballers
1995 births
Living people
Association football defenders
Competitors at the 2017 Southeast Asian Games
Hougang United FC players
Balestier Khalsa FC players
Warriors FC players
Young Lions FC players
Singapore youth international footballers
Southeast Asian Games competitors for Singapore